Gori is a small village in Chad on the banks of the Chari River, near Sarh.  It is the largest of only three villages where Laal is spoken.

Populated places in Chad